The Upper Silesian metropolitan area  is a metropolitan area in southern Poland and northeastern Czech Republic, centered on the cities of Katowice and Ostrava in Silesia and has around 5 million inhabitants. Located in the three administrative units (NUTS-2 class): mainly Silesian Voivodeship, a small western part of Lesser Poland Voivodeship and a small east part of Moravian-Silesian Region. 

The Polycentric metropolitan area lies within the Upper Silesian Coal Basin. Silesian metropolitan area (5.3 million people) with nearby Kraków metropolitan area (1.3 million people) and Częstochowa metropolitan area (0.4 million people) create a great metropolitan area covering 7 million people.

Statistics
Upper Silesian metropolitan area has a population of 5,294,000, with 4,311,000 (81.43%) in Poland (the Upper Silesian polycentric metropolitan area) and 982,000 (18.57%) in the Czech Republic (Ostrava Functional Urban Area). According to Polish Scientific Publishers (PWN) area is 5,400 km², with 4,500 km² (83.33%) in Poland and 900 km² (16.67%) in the Czech Republic. According to the Brookings Institution, area has a population of 5,008,000.

The area consists of several Functional Urban Areas (FUA), each of which is defined as a core Morphological Urban Area (MUA) based on population density plus the surrounding labour pool, i.e. a metropolitan area. This area contains the following FUAs:

Katowice FUA: 3,029,000 (see also Katowice urban area); within Upper Silesian Industrial Region
Bielsko-Biała FUA and Cieszyn FUA: 647,000 (584,000 + 63,000); within north of Cieszyn Silesia and Bielsko Industrial Region
Rybnik FUA, Wodzisław Śląski and Racibórz FUA: 634,000 (526,000 + 109,000); within Rybnik Coal Area
Ostrava FUA: 982,000; within Ostrava-Karviná Coal Area

Data may vary depending on the source, example for same the Katowice city exist sources for 3.5 million people; for the Rybnik – 507,000, while for the Ostrava – 1,153,876.

Economy

Historically, most of the area was characterized by heavy industry since the age of industrialisation in the late 19th and early 20th century. In addition to coal, Upper Silesia also contains a number of other minable resources (methane, cadmium, lead, silver and zinc). Resources of coal to a depth to 1000 meters – about 70 billion tons, the conditions for the extraction – good.

See also
Rhine-Ruhr
Katowice urban area, part of the Upper Silesian metropolitan area
Upper Silesian Industrial Region
Silesian Metropolis, a political and economic association of local municipalities

References

Metropolitan areas of Poland
Geography of Silesian Voivodeship
Moravian-Silesian Region
Transborder agglomerations